Moussa Camara is a Guinean former footballer who played as a defender. He played for the Guinea national team at the 1980 African Cup of Nations, where he scored one goal in three games and was included in the Team of the Tournament.

International career 
Camara scored a goal in Guinea's opening group game at the 1980 African Cup of Nations, a 1–1 draw against Morocco on 9 March 1980. He participated in Syli National's following two matches in the competition.

Honours 
Individual

 African Cup of Nations Team of the Tournament: 1980

References 

Year of birth missing (living people)
Living people
Guinean footballers
Association football defenders
Guinea international footballers
1980 African Cup of Nations players